Szymon Lenkowski (born 28 February 1981) is a Polish cinematographer and director based in Hollywood.

Lenkowski has directed photography for 2 feature films, 15 short films, 10 documentary films, 5 music videos, 10 HD multi-camera live concerts, and over 50 television advertisements. Whilst winning awards for his short films, Szymon was noticed by Warsaw production companies and started shooting commercials. In his mid-twenties, Lenkowski had already worked for numerous global advertising agencies including Publicis, BBDO, Euro RSCG, Grey, and McCann Erickson.

In 2009 he shot his first feature film and received a nomination for Camerimage Festival's Golden Frog award. His second feature film, Shameless, was expected to be released in the summer of 2012. In 2009, together with Piotr Bujnowicz he directed Trailer and More, and began creating movie trailers. In 2010 he was nominated for a Golden Trailer Award for the film General Nil. In 2011 he won the Golden Trailer Award for the Little Rose trailer.

Education
In 2005, Lenkowski graduated from the National Film School in Łódź with a degree in cinematography. He was taught by Polish cinematographer Witold Sobocinski, authoring a thesis titled "Digital Future of Cinema".

Awards 

 2011 – Golden Trailer Awards – Best Foreign Romantic trailer for Little Rose (aka. Różyczka) trailer Szymon Lenkowski, Piotr Bujnowicz - Winner
 2010 – Golden Trailer Awards – Best Foreign trailer for General Nil Szymon Lenkowski, Piotr Bujnowicz – Nomination
 2009 - Polish Film Festival, Gdynia - I am yours (Jestem Twój), Main competition
 2009 - Busan International Film Festival - I am yours (aka. Jestem Twój), World Cinema section
 2009 - Montreal World Film Festival - I am yours (aka. Jestem Twój), World Competition section
 2009 - The International Film Festival of the Art of Cinematography CAMERIMAGE –  Szymon Lenkowski, The best Cinematography in Polish feature film - Nomination
 2008 – Karlovy Vary International Film Festival – Like in heaven (aka. Jak w niebie), Main Competition for Documentary Films
 2008 - 48th Cracow Film Festival – Like in heaven (aka. Jak w niebie), Main Competition
 2007 - DOCSDF, International Documentary Film Festival of México City (Oct-Nov 2007) - The Seeds (aka. Nasiona) Special Mention of the Jury in the Best International Short Documentary competition
 2007 - Parnu International Documentary and Anthropology Film Festival (July 2007), - The Seeds (aka. Nasiona), Grand Prix
 2007 - II International Film Festival Competition CINEMAGIC in Plock (June 2007) - The Seeds (aka. Nasiona), Main Prize
 2007 - 28. Big Muddy Film Festival (Carbondale, USA) - The Seeds (aka. Nasiona), The First Prize for the Short Documentary Film
 2007 - The Big Sky Documentary Film Festival (Montana, USA) - The Seeds (aka. Nasiona), The Jury's Special Prize
 2007 - The CMU International Film Festival 2006 „Faces of Democracy” (Pittsburgh, USA) - The Seeds (aka. Nasiona), The Main Prize in the student's film competition
 2006 - 3rd Festival Kinoteatr.doc (Moskva 2006)
 2006 - XVI Media Festival „Man in Danger” (Lodz, Poland) - The Seeds (aka. Nasiona), The Jury's Special Prize (given for the first time in the history of the festival)
 2006 - International Documentary Film Festival "Flahertiana" (Perm, Russia) - The Seeds (aka. Nasiona), The Great Silver Nanook Prize
 2006 - 46th Cracow Film Festival (May 2006), Grand Prix Złoty Lajkonik, KODAK's Prize for Wojciech Kasperski (dir.) - The Seeds (aka. Nasiona), The Students’ of Cracow Jury Prize
 2006 - 13 L'Alternativa Festival de Cinema Independent de Barcelona - The Seeds (aka. Nasiona), Special Mention
 2006 - “Artdokfest”, National Prize of LAVR (Moscow) - The Seeds (aka. Nasiona), Main Prize for the Art-film (the best writer and director; the best photography; the best producer)
 2006 - Prix Europa, Berlin; - The Seeds (aka. Nasiona), Special Mention for the best television documentary film
 2006 - SILVERDOCS: AFI/Discovery Channel Documentary Festival (USA)- The Seeds (aka. Nasiona); Main prize for the best short documentary film
 2006 - International Film Festival “Kratkofil” Banja Luka, Bosnia and Herzegovina - The Seeds (aka. Nasiona); Grand Prix
 2005 - Berlinale Berlin Today Award - If I Were a Fish, Nomination
 2005 - Kielce (Nurt 2005) - The Dwarfs Are Going To Ukraine (aka. Krasnoludki jadą na Ukrainę), Audience Awards
 2005 – Golden Duck Award of FILM magazine – Cyrano, The Best Independent Film, Nomination
 2005 – OFFSKARY 2005 – Cyrano,
 2004 - CINEMA magazine awards - Cyrano- Best independent film, Best script (Marczewski, Bartosz Kurowski) – awarded, best actor (Maciej Marczewski) – nomination
 2004 – Szymon Lenkowski – Cyrano - KAMERA magazine award for cinematography
 2004 – Warsaw (films tomorrow) - Cyrano, Grand Prix – best student film
 2004 – Kazimierz Dolny (Summer of Films) - Cyrano, Grand Prix – best short film
 2004 – Cracow (Krakffa) - Cyrano, Grand Prix
 2006 - Szymon Lenkowski Cieszyn (School Film) – Poor-land (aka. Bieda ziemia) Award for best cinematography
 2005 - Szymon Lenkowski Offskary – Poor-land (aka. Bieda ziemia), nomination for best cinematography
 2005 - Szymon Lenkowski Cieszyn - (Węgiel Student Film Festival) - Poor-land (aka. Bieda ziemia) best cinematography special mention
 2005 -  Tampere Film Festival Finland – Poor-land (aka. Bieda ziemia), international competition
 2005 – Israel, Docaviv for - Poor-land (aka. Bieda ziemia)
 2005 – Grimstad IFF Nowary - Poor-land (aka. Bieda ziemia), international competition
 2005 – Sopot Film Festiwal – Poor-land (aka. Bieda ziemia), special mention
 2004 – Cracow Film Festiwal – Poor-land (aka. Bieda ziemia), Polish competition
 2004 – IDFA Amsterdam for Poor-land (aka. Bieda ziemia)
 2004 – Offensiva – Dirty World bronze OFF award in the video art category
 2005 – Prowincjonalia 2005 – Winners and Loosers (aka. Zwyciezcy i przegrani), Award for the Best Documentary Film
 2005 – Breslau Optimistic Film Festival “Happy End” – Winners and Loosers (aka. Zwyciezcy i przegrani), Grand Prix
 2004 – Milano (MFFS) Italy - Winners and Loosers (aka. Zwyciezcy i przegrani), “Mention d’Honneur” „Sport and society. Sport and solidarity”
 2003 - Szymon Lenkowski Cannes – Polish representation as part of New Talent Showcase
 2002 - Szymon Lenkowski International Film Festival of the Art of Cinematography– Silver Tadpole

Selected filmography

 2012 – Shameless, (aka. Bez wstydu) feature film, dir. Filip Marczewski. - director of photography
 2011 - In Treatment (aka. Bez tajemnic) HBO Poland TV Series, dir. Anna Kazejak-Dawid, Jacek Borcuch – director of promotional materials, author of trailers, TV spots, promotional films, and next-ons
 2010 - Little Rose (aka. Rosebud, aka. Różyczka)  feature film, dir. Jan Kidawa Błoński - director of promotional materials
 2010 - General Nil feature film, dir. Ryszard Bugajski - director of promotional materials
 2009 – I am yours (aka. Jestem Twój) – feature film, dir. Mariusz Grzegorzek - director of photography
 2008 – Like in heaven (aka. Jak w niebie) - documentary film 28’, dir. Filip Marczewski - director of photography
 2007 – Aria Diva – medium length feature film, dir. Agnieszka Smoczyńska - director of photography
 2006 – The Seeds (aka. Nasiona), documentary film 28’, dir. Wojciech Kasperski - director of photography
 2005 – If I Were a Fish - documentary film 18’, dir. Tomasz Wolski - director of photography
 2005 – The Dwarfs Are Going To Ukraine (aka. Krasnoludki jadą na Ukrainę) - documentary film 58’, dir. Miroslaw Dembinski - director of photography
 2004 – Cyrano - feature film DV 17’, dir. Filip Marczewski - director of photography
 2004 – Poor-land (aka. Bieda ziemia) - documentary film 35mm 5’, dir. Filip Marczewski - director of photography
 2004 – Dirty World, music video 3’, music. artist: TheCalog, - director/ director of photography
 2004 – Winners and Loosers (aka. Zwyciezcy i przegrani) – documentary film 52’, dir. Mirosław Dembinski - director of photography
 2002 – Siena - feature film 4’ - director, director of photography

References

External links 
 Szymon Lenkowski at filmpolski
 
 Official website

1981 births
Living people
European Film Awards winners (people)
Łódź Film School alumni
People from Rzeszów
Polish expatriates in the United States
Polish film directors
Polish screenwriters